Consortin (CNST) is a protein that in humans is encoded by the CNST gene.

References

Further reading